Gabriele Galardi (born 5 February 2002) is an Italian professional footballer who plays as a left-back for Serie D Group H club Gravina.

Career
On 28 July 2020, he joined on loan to Serie D club Nuova Florida.

At the middle of season, on 27 January 2022, he moved to Gravina on loan.

Career statistics

Club

References

2002 births
Living people
Italian footballers
Association football defenders
Serie C players
A.C. Milan players
U.S. Viterbese 1908 players
Lucchese 1905 players